INS Tabar (F44) (translates as "battle axe") is the third of the  of the Indian Navy. The frigate was commissioned on 19 April 2004 in Kaliningrad, Russia with Captain (later Vice Admiral) Biswajit Dasgupta. The current Commanding Officer (CO) of INS Tabar is Captain Mahesh Mangipudi .

INS Tabar reached her home-port of Mumbai on 31 July 2004. INS Tabar is a well-equipped warship that has the ability to handle air/surface/sub-surface missions or defending herself operating either independently on maritime missions or supporting a larger naval task force.

In recent times, the ship has visited various ports of the Persian Gulf on a goodwill mission and the visit was highly successful. The ship also participated in the International Fleet Review at Visakhapatnam. It recently visited Port Louis to participate in the Mauritius National Day celebrations.

Design and performance
INS Tabar'''s 28 officers and 232 sailors living conditions are similar to those on the Royal Australian Navy's s. Fully loaded, INS Tabar has a displacement of 4,035 tons. The main engines of INS Tabar are the Zorya/Mashproekt M7N-1E gas turbine plant comprising two DS-71 cruise turbines (each rated up to 9,000 hp) and two DT-59 boost turbines. One downside for INS Tabar and her sister ships is the amount of smoke her engines produce.

Armament

The surface-to-air weapons systems include one single-rail MS-196 launcher that can launch the long range Shtil-1 (NATO: SA-17) surface-to-air missile. Eight Igla-1E (NATO: SA-16) portable air defence missiles are on board for short-range threats. INS Tabar became the third Indian warship to incorporate an eight cell KBSM 3S-14NE Vertical Launcher and was the first to upload the new Indian/Russian designed missile, the supersonic BrahMos PJ-10 ASCM (anti-sub/ship/surface cruise missile). INS Tabars VLS can launch the Indian designed 3M-54E Klub-N (NATO: SS-N-27) subsonic ASCM. INS Tabar has one  A-190 (E) Dual Purpose Gun mount for surface and air targets.

Two Kashtan Air Defence Gun/Missile mounts are INS Tabars Close-In Weapons System (CIWS). There are 64 Grison reloads (32 each mount) with a package of four missile taking less than two minutes to load. Forward of INS Tabars bridge and aft of the VLS is one 12-round RBU-6000 anti-submarine warfare rocket launch that can fire either Splav-90R rockets or RGB-60 depth charges. Two pairs of fixed  DTA-53 torpedo tubes are located port and starboard midships. Both can launch either SET-65E anti-sub and 53-65KE anti-ship torpedoes.

Sensors
Controlling this array of weapons is the Trebovaniye-M combat information and control system that can control all of INS Tabars weapons as well as using situation analysis to generate combat missions. The combat system can transmit data and process information from up to 250 sources. The M2EM system features continuous scanned arrays along with providing targeting information for the Shtil-1 missile system. One 3Ts-25E Garpun-B radar unit is utilised for long-range surface search and target acquisition. INS Tabar is also equipped with two navigation radars. INS Tabars fire control is the Ratep JSC 5P-10E Puma fire control system. The Puma uses phased array and target tracking radar along with laser and TV devices. The Puma can operate autonomously with the ability of automatically detecting, locking on, and tracking four targets at once.

INS Tabars sonar is the BEL APSOH (Advanced Panoramic Sonar Hull) hull-mounted sonar. The APSOH sonar has active ranging, passive listening, and auto tracking of targets. For countermeasures INS Tabar includes   chaff and infra-red decoy rounds fired by four KT-216 launchers. This ship was originally equipped with the Russian TK-25E-5 electronic warfare suite and was later replaced by the BEL manufactured Varuna ESM/Electronic warfare suite with its distinctive circular housing located above the Fregat radar.

Air operations
For her deployment INS Tabar had a Ka-31 Helix-B AEW helicopter embarked from Indian Naval Air Squadron 339 ‘Falcons’ Squadron in Mumbai. The Ka-31’s airborne early warning radar is the E-801M Oko (Eye), a  planar array located beneath the fuselage.
INS Tabar has also possibility to carry one Ka-28 or one Indian-made HAL Dhruv.

Operations near the Horn of Africa

Following the media attention to the  incident, and a host of other pirate attacks on Indian vessels, as well as the general lawlessness around the Horn of Africa, the Indian government deployed INS Tabar to the area to conduct anti-piracy surveillance and patrol operations. She arrived to patrol the Gulf of Aden on 2 November 2008.

On 11 November 2008, INS Tabar was called into action to fight off a pirate attack on an Indian ship, the 38,265-tonne bulk carrier owned by the Mumbai-based Great Eastern Shipping Company Jag Arnav, and a Saudi-registered vessel, MV Timaha. Both ships had crossed the Suez Canal when they were attacked by pirates who surrounded the vessel in small boats. An Indian navy spokesman said there were no casualties in the operation. "Both the ships had crossed the Suez Canal and were a short distance away from Aden when the Saudi vessel was attacked by these boats, each carrying up to five pirates each. Our frigate patrolling the area responded to a distress call by "MV Timaha" and sent an attack helicopter carrying commandos which opened fire while the pirates were making repeated attempts to board the Saudi ship. While all this was on, the Indian cargo ship was attacked within the next 30 minutes. A Chetak helicopter, carrying a team of MARCOS (Indian Navy Marine Commandos) personnel, was sent to the location of MV Jag Arnav. After the ensuing battle, the team successfully thwarted the hijack attempt. The incident took place  from the coast of Somalia. 
From 2 to 19 November, Indian naval operations in the area, led by INS Tabar, successfully escorted approximately 35 ships, including many non-Indian flagged vessels, safely during their transit through these pirate-infested waters.

On 20 November, an anonymous Indian Navy official announced that Tabar will be replaced in the Gulf of Aden by the destroyer , which at 6,700 tonnes is a larger ship with a greater holding capacity.

International reactions
The head of the International Maritime Bureau's piracy reporting centre in Kuala Lumpur, Noel Choong, said "If all warships do this, it will be a strong deterrent. But if it's just a rare case, then it won't work. It's about time that such a forceful action is taken. It's an action that everybody is waiting for. The United Nations and international community must decide how to solve this grave problem (of piracy). They must be more forceful in their action...[action should have been taken] years back or even last year when piracy was just starting–it's clearly getting worse and out of control."

The United Nations Secretary-General Ban Ki-moon also welcomed a decision by India and other countries to cooperate with Somalia in the fight against piracy in its waters. In a report on Somalia submitted to the Security Council, Ban said "I welcome the decision of the governments of India and the Russian Federation to cooperate with the Transitional Federal Government of Somalia to fight piracy and armed robbery against ships."

Attack and sinking of Ekawat Nava

Just over a week after the MV Jav Arnav incident, on 19 November 2008, the Indian Navy reported that INS Tabar had come under attack from pirates. The crew of INS Tabar requested that the pirate vessel stop to allow a search, but the pirates responded with a threat to sink Tabar if it came any closer. The pirates then opened fire on Tabar before the Indian navy responded by returning fire. After the retaliatory strike, it was reported that a large explosion occurred on the pirate vessel, rumoured to have been caused by the pirates' weapons cache. The attack continued for about three to four more hours, and resulted in the sinking of the pirate's "mother-ship". INS Tabar also forced the abandonment of another pirate vessel, while several pirates managed to escape via a speedboat under the cover of darkness. Recalling the incident to media persons, an Indian naval spokesman, Commander Nirad Sinha, said that "INS Tabar encountered a pirate vessel south west of Oman with two speedboats in tow. This vessel was similar in description to the 'mother vessel' mentioned in various piracy bulletins. INS Tabar closed in on the vessel and asked her to stop for investigation. Pirates were seen roaming on the upper deck of the vessel with guns and rocket propelled grenade launchers. The vessel continued threatening calls and subsequently fired upon INS Tabar."
Reports later surfaced that the sunken "mother-ship" was originally a Thai fishing trawler, captured by the pirates which still had the Thai crew captive on board. One sailor was reportedly still alive, another confirmed dead, and 14 sailors remained missing. The surviving member of the trawler's crew was picked up by a passing ship after six days adrift on the ocean and was taken to Yemen where he informed the owner of the trawler of the events. The survivor said all the crew were tied up under the deck, except the captain and translator.

June to September 2021 Exercise

Combined Maritime Bilateral Exercises like Exercise Varuna with French Navy and Exercise INDRA with Russian Federation Navy will be conducted along with Passage Exercises (PASSEX) across the Gulf of Aden, Red Sea, Suez Canal, Mediterranean Sea, North Sea and Baltic Sea while making port calls at Djibouti, Egypt, Italy, France, UK, Russia, Netherlands, Morocco, and Arctic Council countries like Sweden and Norway. 

INS Tabar on 27 June 2021 arrived in Egypt, in Alexandria. Captain Mahesh paid tributes at unknown soldiers memorial and participated in a two day exercise with the Egyptian Navy Ship Toushka commenced by helo deck landing ops and underway replenishment drills.

The INS Tabar  participated in the maritime exercises with Italian frigate ITS Antonio Marceglia (F 597) on 4-5 July 2021 in the Tyrrhenian Sea. This exercise was covered by air defence, replenishment at sea, communication drills and cross deck helicopter operations during the day and night.

On 15-16 July 2021, INS Tabar undertook  maritime exercises with French navy's FNS Aquitaine in Bay of Biscay. Other than FNS Aquitaine,four Rafale and one NH90  helicopter also participated in the exercise.
This exercise includes the wide range of operations like anti - submarine, surface manoeuvers, underway replenishment, firing on target, visit board search & seizure (VBSS), Steam Past, Air Defence, Air Picture Compilation, Vertical Replenishment and crossdeck operations were exercised by the ships.INS Tabar  participated in Russian Navy Day parade from 22-27 July in St Petersburg. D B Venkatesh Varma, Indian ambassador to Russia visited the ship on 23rd July and later on Vice-Admiral Sergei Yeliseyev visited the ship  and was given Guard of honour'' by the ship's crew. The commanding officer presented the ship's crest at the end of the Vice-Admiral Sergei Yeliseyev's visit.

On 24th July, the commanding officer visited to Piskaryovskoye Memorial Cemetery to pay homage. On on 25th July, the has participated in fleet review along with the 50 ship.

On the last day of her visit, she  was involved in Exercise Indra along with the two ships of Russian Navy on 28-29 July in Baltic Sea. The Exercise  aims to achieve better military relations, interoperability and long-range sustenance. 

The ship visited  Sweden on 30 July. The Indian Ambassador  visited the ship on 31 July.

See also
  - Indian Navy frigate built by Russia.
  - Indian Navy future destroyer
  - Indian Navy future frigate

References

External links
Pictures of INS Tabar and the MARCOS in action in the waters off Somalia.
Article recounting Tabars action written by Prabhasakshi Editor Balendu Sharma Dadhich

Talwar-class frigates
Frigates of the Indian Navy
Piracy in Somalia
2001 ships